Cinema Museum may refer to:

Museums 
 Cinema Museum (Girona), Italy
 Cinema Museum of Thessaloniki, Greece
 Adana Cinema Museum, Turkey
 Melgaço Museum of Cinema, Portugal

Other uses 
 Cinema Museum (London), a charitable organization